Mare Nostrum is the fourth studio album by the Italian symphonic black metal band Stormlord.

Track listing
All songs written by Gianpaolo Caprino and Francesco Bucci, except where noted.
 "Mare Nostrum" – 6:47
 "Neon Karma" – 3:56
 "Legacy of the Snake" (Caprino, Bucci, Pierangelo Giglioni) – 5:14
 "Emet" – 5:26
 "The Castaway" – 5:04
 "Scorn" (Caprino, Bucci, Giglioni) – 4:19
 "And the Wind Shall Scream My Name" – 4:43
 "Dimension: Hate" – 4:49
 "Stormlord" – 6:32

Personnel
 Christiano Borchi - vocals
 Pierangelo Giglioni - guitars
 Gianpaolo Caprino - Guitars, keyboards
 Francesco Bucci - Bass
 David Folchitto - drums

2008 albums
Stormlord (band) albums
Locomotive Music albums